Events in 1948 in animation.

Events

January
 January 3: Bob McKimson's Gorilla My Dreams, produced by Warner Bros. Cartoons and starring Bugs Bunny, premieres.
 January 23: Toei Animation is founded.

March
 March 5: Jack King's Donald Duck cartoon Drip Dippy Donald premieres, produced by Walt Disney Animation Studios. In the short film, Donald tries to sleep despite a dripping kitchen faucet.
 March 20: 20th Academy Awards: 
 James Baskett wins an Academy Honorary Award for his role as Uncle Remus in Song of the South, becoming the first African-American actor to win an Oscar.
 Zip-a-Dee-Doo-Dah from Song of the South, written by Ray Gilbert and composed by Allie Wrubel, wins the Academy Award for Best Original Song.
 Friz Freleng's Tweetie Pie, produced by Warner Bros. Cartoons and starring Tweety and Sylvester, wins the Academy Award for Best Animated Short.

April
 April 17: Bob McKimson's Sylvester cartoon Hop, Look and Listen, produced by Warner Bros. Cartoons, premieres which features the debut of Hippety Hopper.

May
 May 8: Friz Freleng's Buccaneer Bunny  premieres, produced by Warner Bros. Cartoons.
 May 15: Tex Avery's Little 'Tinker premieres, produced by MGM.
 May 27: The Walt Disney Company releases Melody Time, directed by Jack Kinney, Clyde Geronimi, Hamilton Luske and Wilfred Jackson.

June
 June 1: Hanna-Barbera's Tom & Jerry cartoon Kitty Foiled premieres, produced by MGM.
 June 12: Friz Freleng's Bugs Bunny and Yosemite Sam cartoon Bugs Bunny Rides Again premieres, produced by Warner Bros. Cartoons.

July
 July 17: Hanna-Barbera's Tom & Jerry cartoon The Truce Hurts, produced by MGM, is first released.
 July 24: Chuck Jones' Haredevil Hare premieres, produced by Warner Bros. Cartoons in which Marvin the Martian makes his debut.

September
 September 18: Hanna-Barbera's Tom & Jerry short Old Rockin' Chair Tom premieres, produced by MGM.

October
 October 9: Tex Avery's Lucky Ducky premieres, produced by MGM.

November
 November 28: Arthur Davis's The Stupor Salesman, produced by Warner Bros. Cartoons, starring Daffy Duck, premieres.

December
 December 3: Charles Nichols' Mickey Mouse cartoon Mickey and the Seal, produced by Walt Disney Animation Studios, is first released.
 December 11: Hanna-Barbera's Tom & Jerry short Mouse Cleaning premieres, produced by MGM.

Specific date unknown
 Walter Lantz Productions closes down. It will be reopened two years later.

Films released 

 May 27 - Melody Time (United States)
 November 5 - Water for Fire Fighting (United Kingdom)
 December 27 - Happy Holidays (Spain)

Births

January
 January 7: Ichirou Mizuki, Japanese singer, lyricist, composer and voice actor (voice acted, wrote and sang music for various anime films and TV series), (d. 2022).
 January 14: Carl Weathers, American actor, director and former football linebacker (voice of GNC Water Bottle in Eight Crazy Nights, Kirby in Balto III: Wings of Change, Basketball King and God of Basketball in Regular Show, Combat Carl and Combat Carl Jr. in Toy Story of Terror! and Toy Story 4, Omnitraxus Prime in Star vs. the Forces of Evil).
 January 18: M.C. Gainey, American actor (voice of the Captain of the Guards in the Tangled franchise).
 January 22: Robert Alvarez, American animator (Hanna-Barbera, Filmation), storyboard artist (Saturday Supercade, Camp Candy), sheet timer (DIC Entertainment, Visionaries: Knights of the Magical Light, DuckTales the Movie: Treasure of the Lost Lamp, Disney Television Animation, The Mask, Warner Bros. Animation, Cartoon Network Studios, My Life as a Teenage Robot, The Mighty B!), writer (What a Cartoon!) and director (Marvel Productions, Teenage Mutant Ninja Turtles, Hanna-Barbera, Cartoon Network Studios, My Life as a Teenage Robot, Random! Cartoons).
 January 24: Michael Des Barres, English actor and singer (voice of Kano in Mortal Kombat: Defenders of the Realm, Man in the Hole in the Freakazoid! episode "Sewer Rescue", Nostromos in the Batman: The Animated Series episode "Prophecy of Doom").
 January 26: Rumen Petkov, Bulgarian animator, comics artist (Choko & Boko) and director (Johnny Bravo, Dexter's Laboratory, Cow and Chicken, I Am Weasel, The New Woody Woodpecker Show), (d. 2018).
 January 29: 
 Danny Bravo, American former child actor (voice of Hadji in Jonny Quest).
 Marc Singer, American-Canadian actor (voice of Man-Bat in Batman: The Animated Series, Adam in The Greatest Adventure: Stories from the Bible episode "The Creation", Kirk Manlord in the Duck Dodgers episode "Bonafide Heroes").

February
 February 5: Christopher Guest, American-English actor, comedian, screenwriter, composer, musician, director and member of Spinal Tap (voice of Chief M'Bulu, Short and Nurse in Tarzoon: Shame of the Jungle, No Lobes in B.C. Rock, Slamfist and Scratch-It in Small Soldiers, Nigel Tufnel in The Simpsons episode "The Otto Show", Umlatt in the Animaniacs episode "King Yakko", Dupey in the Dilbert episode "The Dupey", Stanley in the SpongeBob SquarePants episode "Stanley S. SquarePants").
 February 14: Teller, American magician, illusionist, writer, actor, painter and film director (guest starred in the Fetch! with Ruff Ruffman episode "You Can't Teach an Orange Dog New Tricks", voiced himself in The Simpsons episodes "Hello Gutter, Hello Fadder" and "The Great Simpsina", the Futurama episode "Into The Wild Green Yonder", and the Scooby-Doo and Guess Who? episode "The Cursed Cabinet of Professor Madds Markson!").
 February 15:
 Tino Insana, American actor (voice of Mr. Grouper in Bubble Guppies, Uncle Ted in Bobby's World, Pig in Barnyard and Back at the Barnyard, Bushroot in Darkwing Duck), (d. 2017).
 Larry DiTillio, American film and television screenwriter (Fat Albert and the Cosby Kids, He-Man and the Masters of the Universe, Beast Wars), (d. 2019).
 February 18: Michel Elias, French actor, comedian and singer (voice of Zösky in Kaput and Zösky, The Turtle in Ratz, Corneil, John and Uncle Rico in Corneil and Bernie, Timothy, Bombo and other various characters in Monster Allergy, various characters in the Oggy and the Cockroaches episode "Chatter Box", dub voice of Papa Smurf and Grouchy Smurf in The Smurfs and the Magic Flute, Cave of Wonders, Gazeem and Achmed in Aladdin, Mr. Hyde, Behemoth and Harlequin in The Nightmare Before Christmas, Jacquimo and Baltringue in Thumbelina, Pumbaa in The Lion King, Owen Burnett in Gargoyles, Inspector Grub, Rigatini and Cookie in Rayman: The Animated Series, Rufus and Dr. Drakken in Kim Possible, Goblin and Poseidon in Codename: Kids Next Door, The Reporter in Monsters vs. Aliens, Doc in Rango, Brent Mustangburger in Cars 2 and Planes, Zangief in Wreck-It Ralph and Ralph Breaks the Internet, The Director of the Amusement Park in Batman: The Killing Joke, Mr. Burnish in Abominable, Ludwig in The Cuphead Show!).
 February 24: Dennis Waterman, English actor and singer (voice of Toaster in Tube Mice, the title character in The Fiddley Foodle Bird), (d. 2022).
 February 28: Bernadette Peters, American actress and singer (voice of Rita in Animaniacs, Sophie in Anastasia, Angelique in Beauty and the Beast: The Enchanted Christmas).

March
 March 2: Ralph Schuckett, American keyboardist, songwriter and composer (4Kids Entertainment), (d. 2021).
 March 4: Brian Cummings, American actor (voice of Doctor Mindbender in G.I. Joe: A Real American Hero, Bumblelion in The Wuzzles, Papa Bear in The Berenstain Bears, Doofus Drake in DuckTales, Mr. Hollywood in 2 Stupid Dogs, continued voice of Sir Tuxford in Adventures of the Gummi Bears).
 March 6: Stephen Schwartz, American composer (Walt Disney Animation Studios, The Prince of Egypt).
 March 12: James Taylor, American singer, songwriter and guitarist (voiced himself in The Simpsons episode "Deep Space Homer").
 March 14: Billy Crystal, American actor and comedian (voice of Mike Wazowski in the Monsters, Inc. franchise, Calcifer in Howl's Moving Castle, additional voices in Animalympics)
 March 20: John de Lancie, American actor (voice of Discord in My Little Pony: Friendship Is Magic, Agent Darkbootie in Invader Zim, Brainiac in Justice League Action, Mr. Olsen in Olaf's Frozen Adventure, Mr. Freeze in DC Super Hero Girls, Q in the Star Trek: Lower Decks episode "Veritas", Sinestro in the Duck Dodgers episode "The Green Loontern", continued voice of Dr. Benton Quest in The Real Adventures of Jonny Quest).
 March 26: Steven Tyler, American singer and member of Aerosmith (voice of Elf Lieutenant and Elf Singer in The Polar Express, Nim Galuu in Epic, Mad Hatter in the Wonder Pets! episode "Adventures in Wonderland", himself in The Simpsons episode "Flaming Moe's").
 March 29: Bud Cort, American actor and comedian (voice of Toyman in the DC Animated Universe, Fritz Drizzle in The Mask: Animated Series).
 March 31:
 Al Gore, American politician, environmentalist and 45th vice president of the United States (voiced himself in the Futurama episodes "Anthology of Interest I", "Crimes of the Hot", "Bender's Big Score" and "The Futurama Holiday Spectacular").
 Rhea Perlman, American actress (voice of Reeka in My Little Pony: The Movie, Rose Johnson in Two Daddies?, Mother Bird in We're Back! A Dinosaur's Story, Nessie in Robot and Monster, Judith in Sing, Cid in Star Wars: The Bad Batch, Ardeth in season 2 of The Critic, Carla Tortelli in The Simpsons episode "Fear of Flying", Agnes in the What's New Scooby-Doo? episode "A Scooby-Doo Halloween", Old Stripper in the American Dad! episode "Finger Lenting Good", Cryptkeeper's Wife, Grandmother and Witch in the Robot Chicken episode "Caffeine-Induced Aneurysm", Golda in the Harley Quinn episode "Being Harley Quinn").

April
 April 1: Marion Wells, American television writer (Hanna-Barbera, Disney Television Animation, Adventures from the Book of Virtues), (d. 2021).
 April 7: Michael Hirsh, Belgian-born Canadian producer (Cookie Jar Entertainment, DHX Media, co-founder of Nelvana).
 April 15: Michael Kamen, American composer, orchestral arranger, orchestral conductor, songwriter and session musician (The Iron Giant), (d. 2003).
 April 16: Jane Aaron, American illustrator and animator (Between the Lions, Sesame Street), (d. 2015).
 April 18: Avi Arad, Israeli-American businessman and film producer (Spider-Man, X-Men: Evolution, Spider-Man: Into the Spider-Verse).
 April 20: Gregory Itzin, American actor (voice of Dick Tracy, William Adama and Police Officer in the Robot Chicken episode "Rabbits on a Roller Coaster"), (d. 2022).

May
 May 3: Chris Mulkey, American actor (voice of Walter Shreeve / Shriek in Batman Beyond).
 May 12: Richard Riehle, American actor (voice of Sheriff Sam Brown in Home on the Range, Bumi in The Legend of Korra, Science Corp Scientist, Secret President Larry and Tutukaka Male in Axe Cop).
 May 20: Tessho Genda, Japanese actor (voice of Kurama in Naruto, Emperor Pierrot in Smile PreCure!, Japanese dub voice of Batman in the DC Animated Universe, Optimus Prime in the Transformers franchise, Tigger in the Winnie the Pooh franchise, Bobby in Animaniacs, Bowler Hat Guy in Meet the Robinsons, Foghorn Leghorn in the Looney Tunes franchise, and Kingpin in Spider-Man: Into the Spider-Verse).

June
 June 1: 
 Natalya Marchenkova, Ukrainian animator and animation director (Kievnauchfilm).
 Powers Boothe, American actor (voice of Gorilla Grodd in the DC Animated Universe, Red Tornado in Justice League Unlimited, Sunder in Ben 10: Alien Force and Ben 10: Ultimate Alien, Dead Justice in Scooby-Doo! Mystery Incorporated), (d. 2017).
 Elena Prorokova, Russian animator, art director (Apples Make You Young, The Humpbacked Horse, Magician Bakhram's Heritage, The Last Petal, Butterfly and Tiger, Nazar the Brave, Shakespeare: The Animated Tales) and director (Bird Catcher, A Fairy-Tale About a Stupid Husband, From 9a.M. To 6p.M., The Way Out - A Steam of Conciousness), (d. 2022).
 June 8: Mike Jittlov, American animator (Animato, The Wizard of Speed and Time).
 June 12: Len Wein, American comic book writer (DC Comics, Marvel Comics, Bongo Comics), editor and television writer (The Transformers, Batman: The Animated Series, Marvel Animation, Exosquad, Conan and the Young Warriors, Phantom 2040, G.I. Joe Extreme, DIC Entertainment, Street Fighter, Mainframe Entertainment, Godzilla: The Series, RoboCop: Alpha Commando, Kong: The Animated Series, Kappa Mikey, Ben 10, Beware the Batman, Transformers: Robots in Disguise, co-creator of Swamp Thing), (d. 2017).
 June 19: Phylicia Rashad, American actress, singer and director (voice of Libba Gardner in Soul, Brenda in Little Bill, Dee Dee Tubbs in The Cleveland Show, Jane Goodfellow in the Teenage Mutant Ninja Turtles episode "What's Michelangelo Good For?", The Boss's Wife in The Life & Times of Tim episode "Theo Strikes Back", Lady Fulten in the Happily Ever After: Fairy Tales for Every Child episode "The Princess and the Pauper", Glacia the Ice Witch in the Sofia the First episode "Winter's Gift", May Songbird in The Rocketeer episode "Songbird Soars Again").
 June 28: Kathy Bates, American actress and director (voice of The Sea Hag in Popeye's Voyage: The Quest for Pappy, Miss Dowdy in Christmas Is Here Again, Mrs. Kadoya in When Marnie Was There, The Girls' Mother in the Adventures from the Book of Virtues episode "Respect", Patrol Officer Jane Cooper in the King of the Hill episode "Lupe's Revenge", D.O. Rothy in the American Dad! episode "Manhattan Magical Murder Mystery Tour").

July
 July 6: Peter Mansbridge, British-born Canadian retired news anchor (voice of Peter Moosebridge in Zootopia).
 July 12:
 Susan Blu, American actress (voice of Arcee in The Transformers, Flim Flam in The 13 Ghosts of Scooby-Doo, Mary "Stormer" Philips in Jem, Sibella in Scooby-Doo and the Ghoul School and the OK K.O.! Let's Be Heroes episode "Monster Party", Nanny Smurf in The Smurfs, Judge J.B. McBride in BraveStarr, Grandma Spankenheimer in Grandma Got Run Over by a Reindeer), and casting director (Warner Bros. Animation, PBS Kids, The Land Before Time, Lost in Oz).
 Ben Burtt, American sound designer (Pixar, Escape From Planet Earth, Star Wars: Forces of Destiny), director, editor, screenwriter, (Star Wars: Droids), and voice actor (voice of the title character in WALL-E).
 Jay Thomas, American actor, comedian and radio personality (voice of Ares in Hercules, Barry Anger in Teacher's Pet, Brett Morris in American Dad!, Mr. Sludge in the Goof Troop episode "A Goof of the People", Achmed Abjeer in the Duckman episode "The Road to Dendron", Bull Seal in The Wild Thornberrys episode "Tamper Proof Seal"), (d. 2017).
 July 19: Brenda Banks, African-American animator (Ruby-Spears Enterprises, Hanna-Barbera, Looney Tunes, This Is America, Charlie Brown, The Pagemaster, The Simpsons, King of the Hill), (d. 2020).
 July 28: 
 Georgia Engel, American actress (voice of Love-a-Lot Bear in The Care Bears Movie, Bobbie in the Open Season franchise, Evelyn in Hercules, Willow Song in The Magic of Herself the Elf, Old Woman in the Hey Arnold! episode "Bag of Money", Rose in the Unsupervised episode "Youngbloods"), (d. 2019).
 Mitch Rochon, American animator (Hanna-Barbera, Heavy Metal, Fire and Ice, The Chipmunk Adventure), director (My Little Pony Tales, Belle's Magical World) and sheet timer (Disney Television Animation, Iznogoud, CatDog, Universal Animation Studios, Clifford's Really Big Movie, LeapFrog, Tutenstein, Avengers Assemble, Central Park), (d. 2021).

August
 August 10: Mark Kausler, American animator (Yellow Submarine, Ralph Bakshi, Walt Disney Animation Studios, Warner Bros. Animation, The Thief and the Cobbler, The Brave Little Toaster to the Rescue, The Brave Little Toaster Goes to Mars, Osmosis Jones, The Simpsons, Looney Tunes: Back in Action), writer and storyboard artist (Garfield and Friends, Osmosis Jones, Looney Tunes: Back in Action, Hi Hi Puffy AmiYumi).
 August 13: Jan Gissberg, Swedish cartoonist animator and director (Peter-No-Tail).
 August 19: Toshio Suzuki, Japanese film producer (Studio Ghibli).
 August 30: 
 Heidi Guedel Garofalo, American animator (Walt Disney Animation Studios, Sullivan Bluth Studios, The Chipmunk Adventure, Space Jam, Quest for Camelot, The King and I, Futurama), (d. 2010).
 Lewis Black, American comedian and actor (voice of Anger in Inside Out, Linnux in Rock Dog, Brain Slug in The Brak Show, Norbert in The Happy Elf, the Deadly Duplicator and Elliot in Harvey Birdman, Attorney at Law, Mr. E in Scooby-Doo! Mystery Incorporated, Spider Bytez/Vic in Teenage Mutant Ninja Turtles, Santa Claus in SpongeBob SquarePants and Kamp Koral: SpongeBob's Under Years, Ragely J. Snarlingtooth in The Epic Tales of Captain Underpants episode "The Angry Abnormal Atrocities of the Astute Animal Agressors", Atheist Steve in the Devil May Care episode "The Atheist", Manobrain in the Duck Dodgers episode "A Lame Duck Mind", Dale in The Penguins of Madagascar episode "Arch Enemy", Ted in the My Gym Partner's a Monkey episode "Hornbill and Ted's Bogus Journey", Gore-Ax in the Robotomy episode "Mean Green", Mayor Stoughton in the Be Cool Scooby-Doo! episode "World of Witchcraft").

September
 September 13: Clyde Kusatsu, American actor and trade union leader (voice of Dr. Zin in The Real Adventures of Jonny Quest, Mr. Wong in Lilo & Stitch: The Series, Grocer in Curious George, Nakasumi in Kim Possible Movie: So the Drama, Mr. Takahashi in Eloise: The Animated Series, Kusunoki Tachi in Heavy Gear: The Animated Series, Domog in The Lion Guard episode "Ghost of the Mountain").
 September 15: Linda Kahn, American television executive (Nickelodeon, Scholastic Entertainment), (d. 2021).
 September 17:
 John Ritter, American actor (voice of Peter Dickinson in The Flight of Dragons, Inspector Gil in Fish Police, Eugene Grandy in King of the Hill, the title character in Clifford the Big Red Dog and Clifford's Really Big Movie, Great Uncle Stew in Stanley's Dinosaur Round-Up, Dr. David Wheeler in the Batman Beyond episode "The Last Resort"), (d. 2003).
 James T. Walker, American animator (Warner Bros. Animation, Disney Television Animation, The Smurfs).
 September 19: Jeremy Irons, English actor and activist (voice of Scar in The Lion King, Bar Rag in The Simpsons episode "Moe Goes from Rags to Riches").
 September 22: Jim Byrnes, American actor and musician (voice of Dr. Light in Mega Man, Merlin in King Arthur and the Knights of Justice, Nick Fury in X-Men: Evolution).
 September 24: Phil Hartman, Canadian-American actor, comedian, screenwriter and graphic designer (voice of Professor Von Joy, Hans-Cuff and Staks in Challenge of the GoBots, Mr. Wilson, Henry Mitchell and Ruff in Dennis the Menace, Air Conditioner and Hanging Lamp in The Brave Little Toaster, Troy McClure and Lionel Hutz in The Simpsons, Psycho Bunny in Eek! The Cat, Calaboose Cal, Hot Dog Vendor and Inspector De Paws in Tom & Jerry Kids, Adolph Hitmaker, Tom Morgan in The Pagemaster, Russian Filmreel Announcer and Midget Clown in The Ren & Stimpy Show, Chauncey in Buster & Chauncey's Silent Night, Game Show Host in the Happily Ever After: Fairy Tales for Every Child episode "The Empress' Nightingale", Vaccu-Spook Auctioneer in The 13 Ghosts of Scooby-Doo episode "Reflections in a Ghoulish Eye", School Patrol Robots and Executive Vice President in The Jetsons episode "Boy George", Captain Frye in the DuckTales episode "Scrooge's Pet", Ace London in the TaleSpin episode "Mach One for the Gipper", Paddywhack in the Darkwing Duck episode "The Haunting of Mr. Banana Brain", Dimitri in the Captain Planet and the Planeteers episode "Mind Pollution", Inspector C. Bass in the Fish Police episode "A Fish Out of Water", Bernie Wasserman and Professor Blowhard in The Critic episode "Eyes on the Prize", Dan Anchorman in the Animaniacs episode "Broadcast Nuisance", Jiji in Kiki's Delivery Service, announcer for Cartoon Network), (d. 1998).

October
 October 8: Johnny Ramone, American musician and member of the Ramones (voiced himself in The Simpsons episode "Rosebud"), (d. 2004).
 October 11: Judy Kaye, American singer and actress (choir performer in Beauty and the Beast: The Enchanted Christmas, additional voices in The Hunchback of Notre Dame and Courage the Cowardly Dog).
 October 17:
 Margot Kidder, Canadian-American actress (voice of Solitaire in GoBots: Battle of the Rock Lords, Mistress Helga in Aaahh!!! Real Monsters, continued voice of Gaia in Captain Planet and the Planeteers), (d. 2018).
 George Wendt, American actor and comedian (voice of Ràoul and Member of the Claws in Garfield on the Town, Ranger #2 in Garfield in the Rough, Johnny Throat and Punchie in The Romance of Betty Boop, Grandpa Frank in Fancy Nancy, Gigi in I Lost My Body, Norm Peterson in The Simpsons episode "Fear of Flying" and the Family Guy episodes "Road to Rupert" and "Three Kings").
 October 19: Mimi Gibson, American actress (voice of Lucky in One Hundred and One Dalmatians).

November
 November 7: Norman Henry Mamey, American composer, conductor, music arranger, musician and orchestrator (The Angry Beavers), (d. 2015).
 November 9: Carlos Loiseau, Argentine comics artist and animator (Ánima Buenos Aires), (d. 2012).
 November 26: Jiří Barta, Czech stop-motion animation director (The Pied Pieper, Toys in the Attic).
 November 30: Victor Bumbalo, American actor, playwright and television writer (Wow! Wow! Wubbzy!).

December
 December 3: Ozzy Osbourne, English musician and television personality (voice of King Thrash in Trolls World Tour, Fawn in Gnomeo & Juliet and Sherlock Gnomes, Duke of Drear in The 7D episode "Bummer Vacation", Sid Fishy in the Bubble Guppies episode "Super Guppies!", Earth Troll in the Fish Hooks episode "Legend of the Earth Troll", himself in the South Park episode "Chef Aid").
 December 9: Robert Blalack, Panamanian-born American visual effects artist (co-founder of Industrial Light & Magic), (d. 2022).
 December 13: Ted Nugent, American rock musician and activist (voiced himself in The Simpsons episodes "I Don't Wanna Know Why the Caged Bird Sings" and "Politically Inept, with Homer Simpson", and the Aqua Teen Hunger Force episode "Gee Whiz").
 December 15: Melanie Chartoff, American actress (voice of Didi Pickles and Grandma Minka in Rugrats, Aunt Nora in Jumanji, Dr. Sunshine in OK K.O.! Let's Be Heroes).
 December 21:
 Barry Gordon, American actor (voice of Donatello and Bebop in Teenage Mutant Ninja Turtles, Razor in Swat Kats: The Radical Squadron, Clamhead in Jabberjaw, Inky in Pac-Man, the Nesquik Bunny for Nestlé).
 Samuel L. Jackson, American actor (voice of Frozone in The Incredibles and Incredibles 2, Gin Rummy in The Boondocks, Mace Windu in Star Wars: The Clone Wars, the title character in Afro Samurai, Whiplash in Turbo, Joseph in The Proud Family episode "Seven Days of Kwanzaa").
 December 22: Lynne Thigpen, American actress (voice of Luna in Bear in the Big Blue House, Judge in the King of the Hill episode "Hank's Dirty Laundry"), (d. 2003).

Deaths

July
 July 9: James Baskett, American actor (voice of the obese crow in Dumbo, portrayed Uncle Remus and voiced Br'er Fox in Song of the South), dies at age 44.
 July 30: Pat Powers, American businessman (first distributor of Walt Disney's Mickey Mouse cartoons), dies at age 77.

September
 September 20: Nicolai Shutorev, American singer (singing voice of Giovanni Jones in the Looney Tunes cartoon "Long-Haired Hare"), dies at age 33.

October
 October 5: Bert Green, British animator and comics artist (International Film Service), dies at age 63.

See also
List of anime by release date (1946–1959)

References

External links 
Animated works of the year, listed in the IMDb